Symphyotrichum concolor (formerly Aster concolor) is a species of flowering plant in the family Asteraceae native to the Atlantic coastal plain and Piedmont areas of the eastern United States, as well as the Bahamas. Commonly known as eastern silvery aster, it is a perennial, herbaceous plant that may reach  in height. Leaves are a grayish-green and have a silky look and feel. The flowers have 8–12 rose-purple, rarely white, ray florets, and pink then purple disk florets.

Citations

References

concolor
Flora of the Northeastern United States
Flora of the Southeastern United States
Flora of the Bahamas
Plants described in 1753
Taxa named by Carl Linnaeus